Juan Máximo Martínez (January 1, 1947 – May 25, 2021) was a Mexican long-distance runner. He won the gold medal in the men's 10,000 metres at the 1970 Central American and Caribbean Games, and twice competed for his native country at the Summer Olympics: in 1968 and 1972. In 1968, at the Mexico City Olympics, he finished in 4th place in both the 5,000 metres and 10,000 metres. In 1972, at the Munich Olympics, he finished 10th in the 10,000 metres.

Personal bests
5,000 metres – 13.44.0 (1969)
10,000 metres – 28.23.14 (1972)

References

1947 births
2021 deaths
Mexican male long-distance runners
Athletes (track and field) at the 1967 Pan American Games
Athletes (track and field) at the 1968 Summer Olympics
Athletes (track and field) at the 1972 Summer Olympics
Athletes (track and field) at the 1971 Pan American Games
Olympic athletes of Mexico
Athletes from Mexico City
Pan American Games silver medalists for Mexico
Pan American Games bronze medalists for Mexico
Pan American Games medalists in athletics (track and field)
Central American and Caribbean Games gold medalists for Mexico
Competitors at the 1970 Central American and Caribbean Games
Central American and Caribbean Games medalists in athletics
Medalists at the 1967 Pan American Games
Medalists at the 1971 Pan American Games
20th-century Mexican people